Campbell Lake is a lake in Carver and McLeod counties in Minnesota, in the United States. It is located within Hollywood and McLeod townships.

Campbell Lake was named for the family of Patrick Campbell, early settlers.

See also
List of lakes in Minnesota

References

Lakes of Minnesota
Lakes of Carver County, Minnesota
Lakes of McLeod County, Minnesota